

Superbike race 1 classification

Superbike race 2 classification

Vallelunga Round
Vallelunga